The 1965 Chicago Cubs season was the 94th season of the Chicago Cubs franchise, the 90th in the National League and the 50th at Wrigley Field. The Cubs finished eighth in the National League with a record of 72–90.

The 1965 Cubs tied a major league record by turning three triple plays. Bill Faul was on the mound on each occasion.

Offseason 
 November 30, 1964: 1964 minor league draft
Bobby Cox was drafted by the Cubs from the Los Angeles Dodgers.
Chris Krug was drafted by the Cubs from the St. Louis Cardinals.
 January 15, 1965: Billy Cowan was traded by the Cubs to the New York Mets for George Altman.

Regular season

Season standings

Record vs. opponents

Notable transactions 
 April 9, 1965: Don Elston was released by the Cubs.
 May 29, 1965: Len Gabrielson and Dick Bertell were traded by the Cubs to the San Francisco Giants for Ed Bailey, Bob Hendley and Harvey Kuenn.
 June 8, 1965: 1965 Major League Baseball draft
Ken Rudolph was drafted by the Cubs in the 2nd round.
Ken Holtzman was drafted by the Cubs in the 4th round.
 September 11, 1965: Ellis Burton was released by the Cubs.

Roster

Player stats

Batting

Starters by position 
Note: Pos = Position; G = Games played; AB = At bats; H = Hits; Avg. = Batting average; HR = Home runs; RBI = Runs batted in

Other batters 
Note: G = Games played; AB = At bats; H = Hits; Avg. = Batting average; HR = Home runs; RBI = Runs batted in

Pitching

Starting pitchers 
Note: G = Games pitched; IP = Innings pitched; W = Wins; L = Losses; ERA = Earned run average; SO = Strikeouts

Other pitchers 
Note: G = Games pitched; IP = Innings pitched; W = Wins; L = Losses; ERA = Earned run average; SO = Strikeouts

Relief pitchers 
Note: G = Games pitched; W = Wins; L = Losses; SV = Saves; ERA = Earned run average; SO = Strikeouts

Farm system 

LEAGUE CHAMPIONS: Treasure ValleyDuluth-Superior affiliation shared with Detroit Tigers

References

External links 

1965 Chicago Cubs season at Baseball Reference

Chicago Cubs seasons
Chicago Cubs season
1965 in sports in Illinois